Francesco Brenti was an Italian painter of the Mannerist style, active in Cremona 1612–1620. He appears to have trained with Giovanni Battista Trotti (il Malosso).

References

 Birth of St. John the Baptist (1612).

17th-century Italian painters
Italian male painters
Painters from Cremona
Italian Mannerist painters
Year of birth missing
Year of death missing